, born , was a Japanese politician, novelist, and journalist. He was proponent of the Freedom and People's Rights Movement.

Born of samurai lineage in what is now Ehime Prefecture, he was the second son of the family. His father, Teisuke, was an accountant. He graduated from a local samurai school and became a teacher in 1869. Thereafter, he moved to Tokyo and worked for the Ministry of Finance for six years before going into the newspaper business. He was imprisoned twice for challenging the existing free press laws and was instrumental in forming the first national political party.  He wrote a political, proto-science fiction novel Setchūbai (Plum Blossoms in the Snow, 1886). The income from his books allowed him to travel to the United States and Europe in 1888, around which time he became the temporary travelling companion of Filipino propagandist and patriot Jose Rizal. He would later acknowledge Rizal's influence in another novel, Nanyo no daiharan (The Great Wave in the South Seas).

In 1890 he was elected in the first national election, but was later ousted because he left the Liberal Party. Suehiro died in 1896 of tongue cancer and was buried in Ehime.

Major works
Suehiro's major works include:
Setchūbai (Plum Blossoms in the Snow, 1886)
Kakan'ō (Songbirds Among Flowers, 1889)

See also
Japanese literature
List of Japanese authors

References

1849 births
1896 deaths
People from Uwajima, Ehime
Politicians from Ehime Prefecture
Japanese writers
Japanese politicians
Japanese journalists